KOLI is a radio station serving Wichita Falls, Texas and Vicinity with a country music format, based in Texas country to distinguish it from sister KLUR which plays mainstream country. It operates on FM frequency 94.9 MHz and is under ownership of Cumulus Media. It is the radio flagship station for the Wichita Falls Wildcats hockey team.

External links
Official Website

Country radio stations in the United States
OLI
Cumulus Media radio stations